The 2001 Women's European Volleyball Championship was the 22nd edition of the event, organised by Europe's governing volleyball body, the Confédération Européenne de Volleyball. It was hosted in Sofia and Varna, Bulgaria from 22 to 30 September 2001.

Participating teams

Format
The tournament was played in two different stages. In the first stage, the twelve participants were divided in two groups of six teams each. A single round-robin format was played within each group to determine the teams' group position. The second stage of the tournament consisted of two sets of semifinals to determine the tournament final ranking. The group stage firsts and seconds played the semifinals for 1st to 4th place, group stage thirds and fourths played the 5th to 8th place semifinals and the remaining four teams which finished group stages as fifth and sixth ended all tied in final ranking at 9th place. The pairing of the semifinals was made so teams played against the opposite group teams which finished in a different position (1st played against 2nd, 3rd played against 4th).

Pools composition

Squads

Venues

Preliminary round

 All times are Eastern European Summer Time (UTC+03:00).

Pool A
venue location: Varna, Bulgaria

|}

 
|}

Pool B
venue location: Sofia, Bulgaria

|}

 
|}

Final round
venue location: Varna, Bulgaria
 All times are Eastern European Summer Time (UTC+03:00).

5th–8th place
 Pools A and B third and fourth positions play each other.

5th–8th semifinals

|}

7th place match

|}

5th place match

|}

Final
 Pools A and B first and second positions play each other.

Semifinals

|}

3rd place match

|}

Final

|}

Final ranking

Individual awards
Players awarded for their performances in the tournament.
MVP: 
Best Scorer: 
Best Spiker: 
Best Server: 
Best Blocker: 
Best Setter: 
Best Receiver: 
Best Digger:

References
 Confédération Européenne de Volleyball (CEV)

External links
 Results at todor66.com
 CEV Results
 Volley

European Volleyball Championships
Volleyball Championship
V
Women's European Volleyball Championships
Women's volleyball in Bulgaria
September 2001 sports events in Europe
Sports competitions in Sofia
Sport in Varna, Bulgaria
2000s in Sofia